Juillet is a surname. Notable people with the surname include:

Chantal Juillet (born 1960), Canadian classical violinist
Christophe Juillet (born 1969), French rugby union player
Francisco Juillet (1898–1987), Chilean cyclist
Patric Juillet, Australian film producer

See also
Lake Juillet, a lake of Côte-Nord, Québec, Canada